UEFA European Qualifiers are the qualifying matches for the UEFA qualification matches as a part of the FIFA World Cup and the UEFA European Championship, trademarked from 2016. For details:
 FIFA World Cup qualifiers
 UEFA European Championship qualifying

See also
 UEFA European Qualifiers broadcasting rights, the joint broadcasting rights package for both aforementioned qualifiers